Root & Cady was a Chicago-based music publishing firm, founded in 1858. It became the most successful music publisher of the American Civil War and published many of the most popular songs during that war. The firm's founders were Ebenezer Towner Root (1822–1896) and Chauncey Marvin Cady (1824 - 1889).

The company's publishings include The Silver Lute, the first music book printed in Chicago. It was eventually used in the city's public school system.

Root & Cady dominated Chicago's music publishing industry until the Great Chicago Fire of 1871 destroyed $125,000 of the firm's inventory, leading to its bankruptcy within a year.  In 1875, the former members of Root & Cady formed a new firm: The Root & Sons Music Company.  The members were (i) George F. Root (1820–1895), (ii) Frederick Woodman Root (1846–1918), George's son, (iii) Ebenezer Towner Root (1822–1896) — George's brother — (iv) William Lewis (1837–), (v) William A. Root — George's brother — and (vi) Charles C. Curtiss (1847–1928), who served as manager.

See also 
 Fanny Crosby (1820–1915), songwriter
 William Lewis & Son Co., offshoot of The Root & Sons Music Company

References
 
 
 
 Root and Cady — Re-Association of the Members of That Famous House, Daily Inter Ocean (Chicago), Vol. IV, Issue 80, pg. 12, June 26, 1875
 Charles C. Curtiss, Manager of the Fine Arts Building, Dies, Presto-Times,'' April 7, 1928, pg. 11

Notes

Music publishing companies of the United States
Publishing companies established in 1858
1858 establishments in Illinois
Defunct companies based in Chicago
History of Chicago

External links 

 The Dena Epstein Root & Cady Research Papers at Newberry Library